Rekhdeipur is a rural area of the Jajpur district in Orissa, India.  It is situated in the border of Dhenkanal district.  .

References

Jajpur district